The Cal Shaw Adobe Duplex is an adobe house located at 129 Central Street in Tonopah, Nevada. The house, which was built in 1905, is typical of the adobe homes commonly built in Tonopah in the early 1900s. The building's exterior is scored to resemble stone; the home's design also features a decorative frieze and a porch supported by turned columns. The home has changed little since its construction and has been called "the best preserved adobe residence in Tonopah" by a local historic survey.

The homes on Central Street formed one of Tonopah's first residential districts. Houses on the street were built using a variety of construction types and designs. For instance, the Cal Shaw Stone Row House, located next to the Adobe Duplex, is another historic house built with a different material and design.

The house was added to the National Register of Historic Places on May 20, 1982.

References

Adobe buildings and structures
Houses completed in 1905
Houses on the National Register of Historic Places in Nevada
National Register of Historic Places in Tonopah, Nevada
Houses in Nye County, Nevada
Tonopah, Nevada
1905 establishments in Nevada